Guy Morrison Bryan (January 12, 1821June 4, 1901) was a U.S. Representative from Texas.

Biography
Bryan was born in Herculaneum in the Missouri Territory on January 12, 1821. His family moved to the Mexican State of Texas in 1831, and settled near San Felipe. The extended Bryan family later settled in Brazoria County, and his parents operated a sugar plantation called Peach Point. Guy Bryan attended the private school of Thomas Pilgrim in Columbia, Texas, joined the Texas Army in 1836, and took part in the Texas Revolution.

In 1842 Bryan graduated from Kenyon College in Gambier, Ohio. He studied law, but never practiced, instead becoming a sugar planter in Brazoria County.  His college classmates included Rutherford B. Hayes, and Hayes visited Bryan at his plantation in 1848.

Bryan served in the Mexican–American War as a private in the Brazoria company commanded by Captain Samuel Ballowe.

During the Civil War Bryan sided with the Confederacy, and served as volunteer aide-de-camp on the staff of Paul Octave Hébert, afterwards serving as assistant adjutant general of the Trans-Mississippi Department with the rank of major. He established a cotton bureau in Houston, Texas in order to escape the Union blockade along the Gulf.

After the war Bryan moved to Galveston (1872), Quintana (1890), and Austin (1898). He was again a member of the Texas House of Representatives in 1873, 1879, and 1887 to 1891, and he served as Speaker in 1873.

Bryan was elected president of the Texas Veterans Association in 1892 and served until his death in Austin, Texas, June 4, 1901. He was interred in the Texas State Cemetery.

Politics
He was a delegate to the 1856 Democratic National Convention. Bryan was elected as a Democrat to the Thirty-fifth Congress (March 4, 1857 – March 3, 1859). He was not a candidate for renomination in 1858. He served as chairman of the Texas delegation to the 1860 Democratic National Convention in Baltimore.

Here are the terms he served in order of when it happened
 House of Representatives
 Representative of the Texas House of Representatives, Brazoria district from December 13, 1847 – November 5, 1849.
 Representative of the Texas House of Representatives, District 27 from November 5, 1849 – November 3, 1851
 Representative of the Texas House of Representatives, District 35 from November 3, 1851 – November 7, 1853
 Representative of the Texas House of Representatives, District 12 from January 13, 1874 – April 18, 1876
 Representative of the Texas House of Representatives, District 35 from January 14, 1879 – January 11, 1881
 Representative of the Texas House of Representatives, District 64 from  May 2, 1888 – January 13, 1891
 Senate
 Senator of the Texas Senate, District 24 from November 7, 1853 – November 2, 1857

Family
His mother was Emily Austin Perry and his father was James Bryan. His grandfather, Moses Austin, had initially obtained permission from Mexico to serve as an empresario to settle Texas. His grandmother is Mary Brown Austin.  His mother Emily's brother was Stephen F. Austin.

His brothers include William Joel Bryan and Moses Austin Bryan.  Stephen Samuel Perry was his half-brother.

References

Sources

1821 births
1901 deaths
People from Herculaneum, Missouri
Speakers of the Texas House of Representatives
Burials at Texas State Cemetery
Kenyon College alumni
Confederate States Army officers
Democratic Party members of the United States House of Representatives from Texas
19th-century American politicians
People from Jones Creek, Texas
Democratic Party members of the Texas House of Representatives
Military personnel from Texas
Texas State Historical Association charter members